Maurice Michael George Swan (born 27 September 1938) is an Irish former professional footballer. He was born in Dublin.

Swan was a goalkeeper who first played with Drumcondra F.C. in his native city before moving to Cardiff City in 1960. Maurice was the youngest player to ever play in the League of Ireland for many years, and at the time of writing, is still the youngest goalkeeper to debut in the League of Ireland, at the age of 15, saving a penalty on his debut.

After Cardiff City, where he played in the old Division 1, he moved to Hull City in 1963 for a fee of £5,000 and had a successful spell there with the highlight being the 1965–66 season as City won the Third Division championship and reached the FA Cup quarter-final. Hull City were defeated by Chelsea after a second-round replay.

After leaving Hull after playing 103 games for them, Swan went back to Ireland to play for Dundalk F.C. in 1968.

He won his only international cap for the Republic of Ireland national football team on 18 May 1960 when he replaced Noel Dwyer at half time in a 4–1 defeat to Sweden in Malmö.

Swan also went on to play for Finn Harps before retiring in the early 1970s. His well-known football-playing nephews are Tony McDonnell and Derek Swan - and Ryan Swan who played for Bohemians. His brother Tony Swan also played in goal in the League of Ireland for Bohemians, Drogheda and Athlone during the same time as Maurice.

After his professional playing career ended, Swan started a career in the Irish  film industry as an electrician, eventually becoming one of Ireland's most successful head electricians, or gaffer, on many TV productions, commercials, music videos, films, and documentaries.

All three of his children, Jeannette, Sean and Niall, played in Tolka Park, the legendary home of Drumcondra FC, in cup finals for the Drumcondra amateur and junior sides of the 1980s and 1990s. His Son Niall started a football company in the U.S. In 2002. Maurice is an avid golfer and a West Ham United fan.

References

External links
Profile from sporthull.co.uk

 Maurice Swan in goal: see 1m:44 secs, Hull City FC vs Chelsea 1966 FA Cup Replay: 
 Swan in action 
 Drums warm up for game V Athletico Madrid 1958. Swan is 3rd from right. 
 Team photo: Swan is goalkeeper 

Republic of Ireland international footballers
Hull City A.F.C. players
Cardiff City F.C. players
Dundalk F.C. players
1938 births
Living people
English Football League players
League of Ireland players
Association football goalkeepers
Drumcondra F.C. players
Finn Harps F.C. players
Republic of Ireland association footballers
Expatriate footballers in England
Republic of Ireland expatriate association footballers